Radzhab Yusupovich Butaev (born 15 December 1993) is a Russian professional boxer who has held the WBA (Regular) welterweight title from October 2021 to April 2022. At regional level he held the WBC-NABF super-welterweight title in 2016

Amateur career
As an amateur, Butaev was a winner of the Kazan Summer Universiade in 2013, fighting at light-welterweight.

In 2015 he won six bouts of the World Series of Boxing.

Professional career

Early career
Butaev made his professional debut against Robert Alexander Seyam on March 25, 2016, and won his debut fight by a first-round knockout. He amassed a 10-0 record over the next two years, with just two victories coming by decision. Buatev faced Lanardo Tyner on March 8, 2019, and won the fight by a third-round technical knockout. Butaev was scheduled to face Silverio Ortiz  on May 3, 2019, whom he beat by unanimous.

On September 30, 2019, it was announced that Butaev would fight Alexander Besputin for the vacant WBA Regular and EBP welterweight titles. Both Butaev and Besputin earned $252,777.50 for the fight, a 50/50 split of the purse. Butaev lost the fight by unanimous decision, with all three judges awarding Besputin a 116-112 scorecard. On January 15, 2020, it was revealed by the Monaco Boxing Federation that Besputin had tested positive for ligandrol, a substance prohibited by WADA. Butaev immediately called the outcome of the fight into question, saying that the positive test was a "...disgrace and is disrespectful to the sport of boxing". The fight was overturned to a no contest on July 6, 2020. Besputin was accordingly stripped of both titles.

Butaev was scheduled to face the undefeated Terry Chatwood on December 26, 2020. He won the fight by a third-round knockout, stopping Chatwood with a left hook to the body at the 1:01 minute mark.

WBA Regular welterweight champion
The reigning WBA Regular champion Jamal James was ordered the face Butaev, who was at the time the #3 ranked WBA welterweight contender, in his first title defense. The fight was ordered on February 4, 2021, and the two were given a 30 days to negotiate before a purse bid would be called. The fight was once again ordered on September 26, 2021, and was later scheduled for October 30, 2021. Butaev achieved his career best win, as he stopped James by technical knockout at the 2:12 minute mark of the ninth round.

Professional boxing record

See also
List of world welterweight boxing champions

References

External links

1993 births
Living people
Sportspeople from Dagestan
Russian male boxers
Universiade medalists in boxing
Universiade gold medalists for Russia
Medalists at the 2013 Summer Universiade
Light-middleweight boxers
World welterweight boxing champions
World Boxing Association champions
20th-century Russian people
21st-century Russian people